S.C. 22 may refer to:

South Carolina Highway 22
 , a United States Navy submarine chaser in commission from 1917 to 1919